Louisiana's 19th State Senate district is one of 39 districts in the Louisiana State Senate. It has been represented by Democrat Gary Smith Jr. since 2012.

Geography
District 19 covers parts of Jefferson, Lafourche, St. Charles, and St. John the Baptist Parishes along Lake Pontchartrain in Greater New Orleans, including some or all of LaPlace, Norco, Hahnville, Boutte, Des Allemands, Destrehan, Luling, St. Rose, Kenner, and Raceland. The district also includes a sizable portion of Lake Pontchartrain itself, hence its unusual shape. 

The district overlaps with Louisiana's 1st, 2nd, and 6th congressional districts, and with the 54th, 55th, 56th, 57th, and 92nd districts of the Louisiana House of Representatives.

Recent election results
Louisiana uses a jungle primary system. If no candidate receives 50% in the first round of voting, when all candidates appear on the same ballot regardless of party, the top-two finishers advance to a runoff election.

2019

2015

2011

Federal and statewide results in District 19

References

Louisiana State Senate districts
Jefferson Parish, Louisiana
Lafourche Parish, Louisiana
St. Charles Parish, Louisiana
St. John the Baptist Parish, Louisiana